Raoul Anglès (21 October 1887 – 9 February 1967) was a French politician.

Anglès was born at Fontainebleau. He represented the Radical Party (from 1914 to 1919) and the Republican-Socialist Party (from 1919 to 1924) in the Chamber of Deputies.

References

1887 births
1967 deaths
People from Fontainebleau
Politicians from Île-de-France
Radical Party (France) politicians
Republican-Socialist Party politicians
Members of the 11th Chamber of Deputies of the French Third Republic
Members of the 12th Chamber of Deputies of the French Third Republic
École Normale Supérieure alumni
French military personnel of World War I
French Resistance members